National Tertiary Route 917, or just Route 917 (or ) is a National Road Route of Costa Rica, located in the Alajuela, Guanacaste provinces.

Description
In Alajuela province the route covers Upala canton (Dos Ríos district).

In Guanacaste province the route covers Liberia canton (Mayorga district).

References

Highways in Costa Rica